Passchendaele or Paschendale may refer to:

Places
 Passchendaele, Queensland, a locality in Australia
 Paschendale, Victoria, a locality in Australia
 Passendale or Passchendaele, a town in Belgium and a World War I battlefield site
 Passchendaele Ridge, a ridge near the village
 Passchendaele, Nova Scotia

Other uses
 Passchendaele (film), a Canadian film
 "Paschendale" (song), a 2003 song by Iron Maiden
 Passchendaele (battle honour), a battle honour awarded to units of the British and Imperial Armies
 Battle of Passchendaele, a World War I military campaign

See also
 First Battle of Passchendaele, a constituent battle of the Battle of Passchendaele
 Passiondale (album), an album by God Dethroned
 Second Battle of Passchendaele, a constituent battle of the Battle of Passchendaele